TV Colosso (also known as The Hot Dog Channel) was a Brazilian children's television series produced by Rede Globo, that began on April 19, 1993, and finished on January 3, 1997. The show utilized puppets, body puppets, remote-controlled animatronics and bluescreen puppets. It stars a group of working dogs in a TV station that struggle to put her TV shows on air.

The show presented the fictional programs "Jornal Colossal"; "Clip-Cão"; "Pedigree", a parody of Rede Globo's soap operas; "As Aventuras do Super-Cão"; "Olimpíadas de Cachorro"; "Acredite Se Puder" (Believe it if you can) satirizing the Ripley's Believe It or Not! ; "ColosShow"; "Asfalto Quente"; "Aprendendo Prá Cachorro"; "CapaShow"; and others.

The show was created by Luiz Ferré, a graphic artist, who also created its characters; and directed by J. B. de Oliveira (Boninho), famous for Rede Globo's hits No Limite (Brazilian version of Survivor) and Big Brother Brasil. The puppets were all made by Roberto Dornelles from Ferré's own puppet company Criadores e Criaturas (100 Modos).

It was a big hit on Brazil and worldwide, but was cancelled due to intense production costs. The show was also broadcast in Japan by NHK.

In 2009, the show's return in April of the same year was discussed by the producer, but not happened. Also in that year, it was reported that a DVD box set featuring the show's most important episodes and a Broadway-inspired musical are in works.

On October 12, 2016, the show resumed production as a webseries for Playkids.

History 
After the ending of Xou da Xuxa in 1993, TV Globo wanted a new children's show for filling the timeslot. Director Boninho got in touch with the artist Luiz Ferré to create a concept for the program.

Characters 
Priscila, a charming female sheepdog, main and only producer and also an artist.
Gilmar (Manny) and his 20.000 Gilmar workers, the group of working dogs.
JF, the pessimistic TV Colosso CEO and mentor, probably a reference to J.R. Ewing 
Capachildo Capachão, JF's servile assistant. His name is a reference to capacho (Portuguese to doormat).
Borges, the bulldog picture director.
Bullborg, Borges' dog-bot.
Walter Gate, the Jornal Colossal host, an homage to Walter Cronkite and to Jornal Nacional host William Bonner, and a reference to Watergate
Waltinho, Walter Gate's son.
Peggy Sunshine, the female weather newsdog.
Paulo Paulada, the security dog.
Jaca Paladium, the host of "Acredite Se Puder", an homage to Jack Palance in Ripley's Believe It or Not!
Vira-Lata de Aço, the show's antagonist.
Camera Ney, the cameraman dog.
Roberval, the chocolate thief.
Castilho, Priscila's annoying boyfriend.
Bob Dog, Priscila's rock 'n' roll star.
Daniel, a keyboarding dog.
Malabi, the magician dog.
Thunderdog, the musician dog and Luiz Thunderbird's parody.
Professor Haftas Arden, the scientist dog. His name is a reference to burning Aphthous ulcer in Portuguese
Ajudante, Professor's assistant.
Dr. Frankenstof, Professor's brother.
Dr. Kobalski, Frankenstof's assistant, probably a reference to one character in Voyage to the Bottom of the Sea (Kowalski)
Godoy, the elderly dog.
Bóris, the not-so-haunted house dweller.
Astor, Bóris' assistant.
Nestor, the repairing dog.
Jaca Palladium's childish fans.
Peteleco, the dog that was kidnapped in Rede Globo's telenovela A Lua Me Disse.
Parmessão & Provolone, the comic pair.
Supercão, the show's super-hero and Gilmar's alter ego.
the fleas that enjoy causing havoc on TV Colosso Studios.
Professor Gagá, the rock 'n' roll singer and professor rooster.
Capachete Capachona, Capachão's professional friend.
Laerte Canini, TV Colosso's scriptwriter and a reference to the show's scriptwriter and cartoonist Laerte Coutinho.
Detetive Farofinha, the Sherlock Holmes dog counterpart.
the winning Viking girl dogs of Capachão's Capashow.
the fairy dogparents who lose the Capashow to her rival Viking girl dogs.
Plínio Bragança Cardoso, son of the Bragança Cardoso family and the protagonist of TV Colosso's telenovela "Inimigos Para Sempre". He has a relationship with Marina Couto Pereira despite its parents' hostility towards the Bragança Cardoso family.
Marina Couto Pereira, daughter of the Couto Pereira family and the female protagonist from "Inimigos Para Sempre". She has a crush towards Plínio Bragança Cardoso while its parents seen to have heartlessness towards the Couto Pereira clan.
Pelados, the rebel boys from the high school who appreciate milkshakes, sports, heavy metal songs and scamming and tormenting the Peludos.
Peludos, the kind-hearted and sensitive boys from the same school as Pelados who, in contrast to them, appreciate classical music, romantic poetry and studying a lot to fulfill their destiny.
Shirley, the popular girl from the high school who loves both the Pelados and the Peludos and despises their cruelty, violence and heartlessness towards each other.
Delicatessen, the princess protagonist from "A Princesa Pirata" who desires to be a pirate in order to ease their boringness.

Making 
The 28 puppets were 25 dogs and 3 fleas.

The body puppets needed dancers to control its movements.

The puppets needed electronic puppeteers and voice actors.

The puppet mechanisms were made by Inventiva Bonecos e Cenários, Ltda. who visited Los Angeles studios searching special effects technology. The animations were radio-controlled, making more realism.

The sets were created by Lia Renha, Maria Odile, Kátia Florêncio and Fernando Schmidt, and had different dimensions variating since miniature to the big ones.

All props were built specially for TV Colosso.

Cartoons
Just below is the list of some series that were shown on TV Colosso:

Adventures of Sonic the Hedgehog
Alvin and the Chipmunks
Animaniacs
Back to the Future
Biker Mice from Mars
Captain Planet and the Planeteers
Chip 'n Dale: Rescue Rangers
Darkwing Duck
Dinosaurs
Dog City
Dungeons and Dragons
Eek! The Cat
He-Man and the Masters of the Universe
Here Comes the Grump
Mighty Morphin Power Rangers
Mr. Bogus
Popeye
Scooby-Doo
Spider-Man
Spiff and Hercules
TaleSpin
Taz-Mania
Teenage Mutant Ninja Turtles
The Adventures of Mickey and Donald
The Smurfs
The Super Mario Bros. Super Show!
Tiny Toon Adventures
VR Troopers
Where's Wally?
Widget
Wish Kid
X-Men

TV Specials

TV Colosso Especial 
This made-for-TV featurette film was aired on December 24, 1993, and retold traditional Christmas stories.

The story tells TV Colosso's gang celebrating Christmas at JF's house and watching special scheduling at a high-technology TV. Priscila, Capachildo Capachão, Thunder Dog and others watch "A Estrela de Belém, Cada Gilmar é um Rei" (loosely based on the "Three Wise Men" classic tale) and "O Avarento" (loosely based on "Ebeneezer Scrooger" by Charles Dickens).

The sets on this special were made by Lia Renha and Fernando Schmidt, the costumes were designed by Billy Accioly, and art was produced by Silvana Estrella.

TV Colosso Especial Terça Nobre 
Due to celebration of Children's Day in 1994, an episode of TV Colosso was specially produced to be shown on Terça Nobre (primetime block), mixing for the first time puppets with live actors.

In this special, Priscila and the gang are producing and hosting the special show. The guest stars were the Rede Globo cast: Renato Aragão, Dedé Santana, Casseta & Planeta Team, Regina Casé, Tom Cavalcante, Xuxa, Sandy & Júnior, Claudio Heinrich, Ana Paula Tabalipa, André Marques and Carolina Dieckmann.

The special was taped at the original sets of TV Colosso and at Teatro Fenix, on Rio de Janeiro, where Fernando Schmidt turned the theater at TV Colosso's auditorium.

Merchandising 
The success of TV Colosso launched 2 records by Som Livre, a feature film, shows, a theatrical play, toys and games by Estrela and Sega, and comic books by Editora Abril.

Super-Colosso - Uma Aventura de Cinema da TV Colosso
Due to major success of TV Colosso, a feature film was produced by Paris Filmes, Criadores e Criaturas, Ltda. and Play Video Produções Para TV & Cinema. The film was released in 1994 and the biggest sadness about it were its R$2,000,000 budget and that to date his producers didn't pay incentive taxes.

Plot 
Priscila, Alice, Gilmar, Capachildo Capachão, JF, Nestor, Castilho, Malabi, Walter Gate, Waltinho, Borges, Bullborg, Bóris, Jaca Paladium, Paulo Paulada, and all staff of TV Colosso want to throw a party to celebrate the Dog's Day. They organize a game contest, and Gilmar chooses the Thinker Dog Statue, by renowned sculptor Cacheau Rodin, as a trophy. But Afrânio Furtado, Dona Jóia Furtado and his children Rubi and Furtadinho manage to steal it, trying to cut the fun short.

Cast 
Rafael Nomais: Marcelo Serrado
Alice: Luana Piovani
The Furtado Family: Antônio Carlos Falcão, Debora Olivieri, Jussara Marques, Fredy Allan
Gabriela: Ilana Kaplan
Flávio: Luciano Quirino
The French Delegation: Bhá Bocchi Prince, Graziella Moretto, Luiz Miranda
voice of Priscila: Mônica Rossi
voices of Gilmar/Supercão, Malabi and Professor Cacá: Mário Jorge
voice of Castilho: Marco Ribeiro
voices of Capachão and Nestor: Mauro Ramos
voices of JF, Thunderdog, and Daniel: Garcia Júnior
voice of chicken song teacher: Carmen Sheila
voices of Jaca Paladium, Paulo Paulada and Vira-Lata de Aço: Hamilton Ricardo
voice of flea: Isis Koschdoski
voices of Walter Gate, Sr. Bóris, Bullborg and flea: Márcio Simões
voice of Waltinho: Reynaldo Buzzoni
voice of Peggy Sunshine and flea: Sheila Dorfman
additional voices: Marco Antônio, Hércules Fernando (uncredited), Carlos Seidl (uncredited)
puppeteers: Airton Aranha, Álvaro Petersen (uncredited), Ana Andreata, Astrid Toledo, Cacá Sena, Érica Tucherman, Fernanda Silveira, Guilherme Pires, Henrique Serrano (uncredited), José Carnevale, Luciano Quirino, Luiz Cláudio Pacini, Magda Crudelli (uncredited), Marcelo Burkoff, Marcos Lima, Marcos Toledo (uncredited), Paulo Adriane (uncredited), Paulo Ferrer, Pi Heins, Quiá Rodrigues, Renato Spineli, Roberto Dornelles, Rodrigo Scarpa (uncredited), Zé Clayton

Crew 
director: Luiz Ferré
puppet director: Roberto Dornelles
voice director: Mário Jorge
production director: Siomara Blumer
production coordinators: Geno Riva, Socorro Goes
executive producer: Guga de Oliveira
music: Ruriá Duprat
editor: Luiz Elias
costume designer: Sylvia Moraes
art director: Felipe Tassara
director of photography: Christian Lesage
script: Giba Assis Brasil, Laerte

Crew 
created by: Luiz Ferré, Roberto Dornelles
written by: Valério Campos, Toninho Neves, Laerte, Angeli, Glauco, Luiz Gê, Fernando Gonzalez, Newton Foot, Gilmar Rodrigues, Adão Iturrusgarai, Flávio Luiz, Nani, Ique, Chico Soares, Toni Marques, Antônio Costa Neto, Luiz Martins, José Rubens Chachá
English adaptation: Kyle Logan, Michael Bruza, Juliana Gaspari
puppeteering director: Roberto Dornelles
directed by: J. B. de Oliveira (Boninho), Mário Meirelles, Roberto Vaz
puppets - Criadores e Criaturas, Ltda.: Luiz Ferré, Roberto Dornelles, Zé Clayton, Jacyra Santos, Totoni Silva, Luiz Rogério, Fernanda Silveira, Sidney Beckencamp
puppeteers: Quiá Rodrigues, Renato Spinelli, Cacá Sena, Érica Tucherman, Julice de Paula, Mário de Ballentti, Joana Correa, Jefferson Antônio, Milton Carvalho, Renato Coelho, Paulo Adriane, Henrique Serrano, Marcos Toledo, Magda Crudelli, Álvaro Petersen, Otávio Ferreira, Charlene Brito, Gabriel Bezerra, Rodolpho Brandão, Vandriani Lazarini, Airton Aranha, André Vagon, Cláudia Raduzewsky
voices directed by: Mário Jorge
American voice directors: Michael Bruza, Kyle Logan
narrator: Sylvia Salustti
with the voice talents of: Mário Jorge, Mônica Rossi, Ísis Kochdosky, Garcia Jr., Guilherme Briggs, Sheila Dorfman, Márcio Simões, Carmen Sheila, Hércules Fernando, Carlos Seidl, Marco Antônio, Hamilton Ricardo, Mauro Ramos, Marco Ribeiro, Reynaldo Buzzoni
English voice cast: Dorothy Fahn, Sandy Fox, Nathan Turner, Brian Habicht, Kelly Jean Badgley
puppet technicians: Daniel Segal, Sidnei Antonioli
production coordinator: Jayme Henriques
editing: Marco Siciliano, Robson M. Schneider, Rosemeire Barros
production team: Mara Martins, Mário Viana, Sérgio Barata, Gilson de Souza, Carla Braga, José de Andrade
sets designed by: Lia Renha, Maria Odile, Kátia Florêncio, Fernando Schmidt
costumes designed by: Cao, Lúcia Cunha, Billy Accioly, Helena Araújo, Bia Rocha, Marília Carneiro
art produced by: Silvana Estrella
visual effects: Pojucan
camera: Paulo Cesar Moreira, Maurício Soares, Afonso Enrique, Oswaldo Rogério, Lídio Carlos, Jorge Gaby
sound designed by: Leonardo da Vinci
music: Rodolfo Rebuzzi, Ricardo Ottoboni, Edson e Felipe, Fernando Figueiredo
music directed by: Márcio Vip Antonucci
cinematography: Manuel Neves
main titles by: Hans Donner, Nilton Nunes, Ruth Reis, Capy Ramazzina
director of photography: Luiz Paulo Nenem
executive producer: Flávio Goldemberg
production director: Marcelo Paranhos
art directed by: Ana Blota, Maurício Sherman
production: CENTRAL GLOBO DE PRODUÇÃO

DVD 
In October 2009, Som Livre and Globo Marcas released a DVD trilogy focusing the show's best episodes:
 Volume 1: A Princesa Pirata e As Aventuras do Supercão
 Volume 2: A Carrocinha do Amor e outras histórias
 Volume 3: Inimigos Para Sempre e a dupla Rodoválio e Gumercindo.

See also 
The Muppet Movie
The Great Muppet Caper
The Muppets Take Manhattan
Sesame Street Presents Follow That Bird
Labyrinth
Teenage Mutant Ninja Turtles
Teenage Mutant Ninja Turtles II: The Secret of the Ooze
The Muppet Christmas Carol
Teenage Mutant Ninja Turtles III
Muppet Treasure Island
Muppets from Space
The Adventures of Elmo in Grouchland
The Country Bears
The Muppets
Muppets Most Wanted

References

External links 
Info about TV Colosso (in Portuguese)

Rede Globo original programming
Brazilian television shows featuring puppetry
Brazilian children's television series
Portuguese-language television shows